Ousterhout is a surname. Notable people with the surname include:

Douglas Ousterhout (born 1935), American surgeon
John Ousterhout (born 1954), American computer scientist

See also
Osterhout
Oosterhout (disambiguation)